Biasca railway station is a railway station in the Swiss canton of Ticino and municipality of Biasca. The station is on the original line of the Swiss Federal Railways Gotthard railway, at the foot of the southern ramp up to the Gotthard Tunnel.The line through the Gotthard Base Tunnel, now used by most trains on the Gotthard route, diverges from the existing line to the south of Biasca station (but before Osogna), passing on the surface to the west of the town before entering the tunnel proper at Bodio. Biasca station can therefore only be served by trains on the slower, but much more scenic, original route.

Between 1906 and 1973, Biasca was the junction for the metre gauge Biasca–Acquarossa railway to Acquarossa in the Valle di Blenio.

Services 
 the following services stop at Biasca:

The station is also served by bus services operated by Autopostale, including an hourly service between Bellinzona and Airolo that parallels the railway line, and Autolinee Bleniesi, who provide service to the Valle di Blenio.

Gallery

References

External links 
 
 

Railway stations in Ticino
Swiss Federal Railways stations